The Phönix 20.24 was a prototype German fighter plane built in the last months of World War I.

Development
The Phönix 20.24 was similar to the D.III but differed in having a semi-monocoque fuselage and an Austro-Daimler engine. Two prototypes were built with the serials 20.24 and 20.25, entered in the July 1918 fighter competition but remained at the prototype stage only.

Production aircraft would very likely have been allocated the LFT designation Phönix D.IV, according to Phönix company records.

Specifications (20.24)

References

Military aircraft of World War I
1910s German fighter aircraft
D.IV
Single-engined tractor aircraft
Biplanes
Aircraft first flown in 1918